Mitranthes is a formerly accepted genus of plant in the family Myrtaceae. It was described as a genus in 1856. , it is regarded by Plants of the World Online as a synonym of the genus Psidium, although many of its former species have been moved to the genus Myrcia.

Former species include:
 Mitranthes clarendonensis (Proctor) Proctor → Myrcia clarendonensis
 Mitranthes macrophylla Proctor → Myrcia asperorum
 Mitranthes nivea Proctor  → Myrcia chionantha

References

Historically recognized angiosperm genera
Myrtaceae
Taxonomy articles created by Polbot